Yang Mei (1560s –  1601) was a Chinese yiji (courtesan) of the Ming dynasty who also performed kunqu on stage. She was very close to the writer Mei Dingzuo.

Relationships
Her private quarter in Nanjing was called the Flowing Waves Pavilion (Liubo guan ), and the Jinling Poetry Society often gathered there. Mei Dingzuo wrote at least eight poems that mentioned the name "Flowing Waves" either in its title or its text. Their contents suggest an intimate relationship between him and Yang. Several of the poems mention another friend Wu Jiadeng who was present in the gatherings. Wu wrote a poem in her memory after her death. Zang Maoxun and Wu Zhao also wrote about some of the gatherings at the Flowing Waves Pavilion.

Acting
The Flowing Waves Pavilion often featured theatre performances. Yang Mei was considered a dedicated actress: when she played Ru Ji in Stealing the Seal, she would prostrate herself on the cold floor for a long time even on snowy days. The theatre critic Pan Zhiheng once ranked Yang Mei the highest among seven prominent courtesan-actresses:

According to Pan, Yu Si once violated her family's midnight curfew — she snuck out of the house — just to watch Yang Mei perform.

References

 

16th-century Chinese actresses
1601 deaths
1560s births
Ming dynasty courtesans
Kunqu actresses